The North Eastern Reporter, North Eastern Reporter Second and North Eastern Reporter Third  are United States regional case law reporters.  It is part of the National Reporter System created by John B. West for West Publishing Company, which is now part of Thomson West.

The North Eastern Reporter contains published U.S. state appellate court case decisions for:
 Illinois
 Indiana
 Massachusetts
 New York
 Ohio

When cited, the North Eastern Reporter, North Eastern Reporter Second and North Eastern Reporter Third are abbreviated "N.E.", "N.E.2d" and "N.E.3d", respectively.

References

National Reporter System